The Domestic Terrorism Counsel (DTC) is a position within the Counterterrorism Section of the United States Department of Justice National Security Division (NSD).

Function
The DTC's functions are to:

 become a main point of contact for U. S. Attorneys working on domestic terrorism matters; 
 ensure proper coordination of domestic terrorism cases; 
 serve a key role in DOJ headquarter-level efforts to identify domestic terrorism trends and to analyze legal gaps and enhancements; 
 help direct DOJ Domestic Terrorism Executive Committee efforts by providing members with overview and insights for various domestic terrorism cases and trends within the United States.

History 
Creation of the DTC post was announced by NSD Assistant Attorney General John P. Carlin, in October 2015, during a domestic terrorism seminar at George Washington University. Carlin stated that the position would serve to ensure that the DOJ benefited from domestic terrorist-related information and input it received from around the country. He added that an appointment had been made to fill the position, but did not disclose the Counsel's name.

References

External links 
Video: National Security and Domestic Terrorism. C-SPAN. October 14, 2015. Retrieved October 15, 2015.

United States Department of Justice officials